The FIFA World Cup is considered the most prestigious association football tournament in the world. The twenty-two World Cup tournaments have been won by eight national teams. Brazil have won five times, followed by Germany and Italy with four titles each; Argentina with three titles, France and Uruguay, with two titles each; and England and Spain, with one title each. The role of the manager is to select the squad for the World Cup and develop the tactics of the team. Pressure is attached to the role due to the significance of winning a World Cup and the lack of day-to-day contact with players during the regular club season aside from international breaks.

Alberto Suppici led the Uruguay national team to victory in the inaugural tournament in 1930. Vittorio Pozzo is the only person who has won the World Cup twice as a manager, in 1934 and 1938 with Italy. Twenty-one different managers have won the World Cup and all winning managers led their own country's national team. Five other managers finished as winners once and runners-up once; both Helmut Schön (winner in 1974, runner-up in 1966) and Franz Beckenbauer (winner in 1990, runner-up in 1986) for West Germany, Carlos Bilardo (winner in 1986, runner-up in 1990) for Argentina, Mário Zagallo (winner in 1970, runner-up in 1998) for Brazil, and Didier Deschamps (winner in 2018, runner-up in 2022) for France.

Carlos Alberto Parreira holds the record for managing at the most FIFA World Cup final tournaments with six appearances while managing five different national teams. Schön, who led West Germany to victory in the 1974 World Cup, has managed the most matches in the tournament at 25, and won a record 16 matches during his spell as West Germany manager from 1966 to the 1978 FIFA World Cup. Suppici is the youngest manager to win the World Cup, being 31 in 1930. Zagallo and César Luis Menotti were also in their 30s when they won the World Cup. Zagallo was 38 years old in 1970 and Menotti was 39 years old in 1978. Vicente del Bosque is the oldest coach to win the World Cup at 59 in 2010.

Three men have won the tournament both as a player and as a manager; Zagallo (as a player in 1958 and 1962, as a manager in 1970), Beckenbauer (as a player in 1974, as a manager in 1990) and Didier Deschamps (as a player in 1998, as a manager in 2018). Both Beckenbauer and Deschamps were also the captain of their respective teams while winning the World Cup as a player.

Winning managers

By nationality

See also
 List of FIFA World Cup winning players

Notes

Bibliography

References

External links 
 FIFA.com

winning managers
Lists of association football managers